Ta Gegonota tis Achaias was a daily newspaper that was founded in 1987 in Patras, Greece.  It was owned by the company Patraikes ekdoseis monoprosopi EPE (Πατραϊκές εκδόσεις μονοπρόσωπη ΕΠΕ) and is written by Ekdotiki Patron A.E. (Εκδοτική Πατρών ΑΕ).

See also
List of newspapers in Greece

References
The first version of the article is translated and is based from the article at the Greek Wikipedia (el:Main Page)

Greek-language newspapers
Newspapers published in Patras
Daily newspapers published in Greece

el:Τα Γεγονότα της Αχαΐας